Sioux Narrows Airport  was an airport located  southeast of Sioux Narrows, Ontario, Canada. The airport is no longer in service.

References

Defunct airports in Ontario